Menakuru is a village located in the Naidupet mandal of Nellore, Andhra Pradesh, India. It is a designated Special Economic Zone (SEZ).

References

Villages in Nellore district